Towalaga is an unincorporated community in Spalding County, in the U.S. state of Georgia.

History
A variant name is "Towaliga". The community derives its name from the Towaliga River.

References

Unincorporated communities in Spalding County, Georgia
Unincorporated communities in Georgia (U.S. state)